is a paleoanthropological site located on Ishigaki Island of the Yaeyama Islands in Japan. Shiraho Saonetabaru is a limestone cave.

It was discovered in 2007 when plans for the New Ishigaki Airport were being developed. Remains of human heads, feet and arms were found, in all 9 bone fossils, by the Okinawa Limestone Cave Association between 2007 and 2009, and three human samples were dated to between 20,000-16,000 years before present. In the ruins were also found bones from wild boar and birds (one animal bone calibrated at 12,000 BP), while during the three months in 2011 were discovered approximately 300 human bones from the stratum between 24,000-20,000 years old.

In 2015, researchers from the University of the Ryukyus and University of Tokyo succeeded in radiocarbon dating three out of five of the bones tested. The three bones yielded the following dates: (20,030 to 18,100 years BP), (22,890 to 22,400 years BP) and (24,990 to 24,210 years BP). 

The investigation held between 2012 and 2016 found more than 1,000 human fragments from at least 19 human skeletons. The "No. 4" almost full skeleton was dated about 27,000 BP, being the oldest full skeleton discovered in East Asia and several thousand years older than the skeletons of the Minatogawa people. Due to the skeletons' postures, the site has been confirmed as the first graveyard in the Paleolithic age in Japan.

See also
Yamashita Cave Man
Pinza-Abu Cave Man
Minatogawa Man
History of the Ryukyu Islands

References

Buildings and structures in Okinawa Prefecture
Ryukyu Islands
Yaeyama Islands
Archaeological sites in Japan
Paleolithic sites in Japan
Caves of Japan